Charlie was a British rock band that was formed in 1971 by the singer/songwriter Terry Thomas. The group was most active as a recording unit from the mid-1970s to 1986. Charlie never charted in the UK but had four minor hits in the US: "Turning To You" (1977) "She Loves to Be In Love" (1978), "Killer Cut" (1979) and "It's Inevitable" (1983).

History
The band was briefly called "Charlie Cuckoo" (after a racehorse), but soon became known simply as "Charlie". The original members were:

Terry Thomas - lead vocals, guitar
John Anderson - backing vocals, bass guitar
Steve Gadd - drums (not to be confused with American session drummer of the same name)
Martin Smith - backing vocals, guitar

The band debuted as a recording act in 1973, issuing the non-charting single "I Need Your Love" on Decca in the UK. Although the band had a contract for four singles with Decca, only one more ("Knocking Down Your Door") was recorded, and it was never released.

Three years later, Charlie released their first album Fantasy Girls. Thomas was Charlie's primary songwriter for this and all future albums, although he also collaborated with other band members from time to time. Charlie supported The Who at their 1975 Hammersmith Odeon Christmas shows and toured the UK in spring 1976 as a support act to the Dutch progressive rock band Focus to promote the album. Smith left after the first album and was replaced by the keyboard player Julian Colbeck.

The group's second album, No Second Chance, began the practice of having a photograph of a female model as the album's cover. "Turning To You", from that album, was Charlie's first chart entry, peaking at #96 in the US. Thomas also produced the album, with John Anderson. All future Charlie releases were produced by Thomas, usually in association with one or more band members.

Eugene Organ was added as a fifth member on guitar for the following two albums, Lines in 1978 and Fight Dirty in 1979. The band had its biggest hit in 1978 with "She Loves to Be In Love", which peaked at #54 in the US. In the following year, the band had another minor hit with "Killer Cut", which rose to #60 in the US. By this time, Shep Lonsdale had been added as an official sixth member, playing drums and percussion alongside Gadd on all of Fight Dirty.

Colbeck and Organ left in 1980 amid some turmoil, after having finished recording of the group's planned fifth album, Here Comes Trouble. Colbeck wrote, "Finally, the touring band line-up of Terry Thomas, John Anderson, Eugene Organ, Steve Gadd, and myself ceased operations once Arista refused to release Here Comes Trouble, and our caring, sharing management company immediately cut off all our money in 1980. That's a whole other story but, for the record, our final gig was in 1979 at the Civic Center in Providence, Rhode Island on Monday 29 October, alongside Foreigner." Thomas commented, "Arista our new label in the U.S. wanted more songs - our company in the UK - Trident Audio Productions - refused to put us in the studio or spend any more money. The UK record company - Polydor - wouldn't release it until it had a U.S. release. Effectively Charlie had no record label and no money to live on. Eugene and Julian decided to leave."

In 1981, a reorganised Charlie issued the album Good Morning America for RCA Records. Produced by Thomas and John Verity, the band now consisted of Thomas, Anderson, Gadd, Verity (vocals, guitar, formerly with the band Argent) and second drummer Bob Henrit (also ex-Argent). (Lonsdale had moved on to work for the band Toto as a sound engineer, mixing their live shows.) The previously unissued Here Comes Trouble, recorded in 1980, was finally released in 1982, albeit only in continental Europe.

In 1982, Verity left to pursue a solo career and Terry Slesser joined the group as the new lead singer, while Thomas, still a member of the band, began concentrating more on the instrumentation. In 1983, the group had their most successful hit single, "It's Inevitable", which peaked just inside the US Top 40 at #38. The MTV music video showed a humorous kitchen pie fight. On the American Top 40 countdown show from 20 August 1983, Casey Kasem informed listeners about a "slight discrepancy" on the previous show from 13 August. There "Pieces of Ice" by Diana Ross had been played as the song at #38 on the countdown but actually was at #45. The real #38 song would have been "It's inevitable" by Charlie. The accompanying album, Charlie, was a flop, however, and the band soon folded.

In 1986, Thomas resurrected the band identity, while essentially working as a solo artist. For the 1986 Charlie album In Pursuit of Romance, Thomas is the only credited band member, though there are some contributions made by session musicians. Thomas wrote, "This was basically a contractual album - Steve had gone off to work with Iron Maiden as a drum tech and John had a job in the telecommunications industry. I ended up making the whole album by myself - it put me in the hospital!"

After a long lay off, in 2009 Charlie released the first album of new material in 23 years, Kitchens Of Distinction. It began life as a Terry Thomas solo project, but as the finished product included contributions from Martin Smith and Julian Colbeck amongst others, the decision was made to credit the CD to Charlie.

Gadd died on 27 March 2013, after a year-long battle with cancer.

Charlie released what was billed as a final album, Elysium, in late 2015. The band then consisted of Terry Thomas (vocals, guitar), Andy Bloom (guitar), Elliot Thomas (guitar), Martin Smith (steel guitar), Julian Colbeck (keyboards), Charlie Barratt (bass guitar) and Steve Alexander (drums).

Discography

Albums
Fantasy Girls (1976)
No Second Chance (1977) - #111 in US
Lines (1978) - #75 in US
Fight Dirty (1979) - #60 in US
Good Morning America (1981) - #201 in US
Here Comes Trouble (1982)
Charlie (1983) - #145 in US
In Pursuit of Romance (1986)
Kitchens Of Distinction (2009)
Elysium (2015)

Compilation albums
Charlie Anthology (2007)
No Second Chance (Limited Edition Vinyl) (2020)
Lines (Limited Edition Vinyl) (2020)

Note that in earlier editions of Joel Whitburn's Billboard chart books, a Charlie album called Fifth Flight is listed as having charted in 1981 at #99.  This album did not exist, and never charted — its inclusion in Whitburn's book is either an error or a deliberate copyright trap. In any event, later editions of Whitburn's books (post-2006) make no mention of it.

Members
Terry Thomas: lead vocals, guitar (1976-1984, 1986, 2009)
John Anderson: backing vocals, bass guitar (1976–1984)
Steve Gadd: drums (1976–1984)
Martin Smith: backing vocals, guitar (1976–1977, 2009)
Julian Colbeck: keyboards (1977–1980, 2009)
Eugene Organ: guitar (1978–1980)
Shep Lonsdale: drums (1979)
Bob Henrit: drums (1981-1983)
John Verity: lead vocals, guitar (1981)
Terry Slesser: lead vocals (1982–1984)
Graham Broad: drums (1986)
Richard Cottle: keyboards, saxophone (1986)
Felix Krish: bass guitar, keyboards, backing vocals (1986)
Linda Thomas: backing vocals (1986)

References

External links

Charlie Forum fansite
Classicwebs.com

 

British rock music groups
Musical groups established in 1971